William Henry Walker (October 7, 1903 – June 14, 1966) was a professional baseball left-handed pitcher over parts of ten seasons (1927–1936) with the New York Giants and St. Louis Cardinals. He was the National League ERA champion twice (1929 and 1931) with New York. For his career, Walker compiled a 97–77 record in 272 appearances with a 3.59 ERA and 626 strikeouts.

Walker was born and later died in East St. Louis, Illinois, on June 14, 1966, at the age of 62.

See also

 List of Major League Baseball annual ERA leaders

References

External links

1903 births
1966 deaths
Major League Baseball pitchers
Baseball players from Missouri
St. Louis Cardinals players
New York Giants (NL) players
Sportspeople from East St. Louis, Illinois
National League ERA champions
National League All-Stars
Duncan Oilers players
Miami Indians players